Route 167 is an isolated provincial highway in Quebec, Canada. It begins at the shore of Lac Saint-Jean in Saint-Félicien. There are no services along this long stretch. At Chibougamau, the highway turns north-east towards Mistissini.

Maps are conflicting about the northernmost extent of this highway. According to Ministère des transports publication "Distances routières", the route continues up as far as Lac-Albanel, east of Lac Mistassini.

Municipalities along Route 167

 Saint-Félicien
 La Doré
 Lac-Ashuapmushuan
 Chibougamau
 Mistissini

Extension
The Quebec Department of Transportation has proposed to extend Route 167 North, in the direction of the Otish Mountains, approximately 250 km to the northeast of Albanel Lake.

Construction began in February 2012. The 240 km extension to the Stornoway Renard Mine was completed in 2014.

The first deliveries of liquified natural gas, by truck, with the new road were made in June 2016 to the Renard Mine.

In 2020 a Memorandum of Understanding was signed between the James Bay Cree Nation of Eeyou Istchee and the Government of Québec. The MOU sets a roadmap for infrastructure development. Phase II of the Infrastructure program includes Extension of Route 167 to the north to connect with the Trans-Taiga Road, over an approximate distance of 125 km.

See also
 List of Quebec provincial highways

References

External links  
 Interactive Provincial Route Map (Transports Québec) 
Route 167 on Google Maps

167
Chibougamau